Sergio Piñero (born 28 November 1974, in Spain) is a trap shooter who competes for the Dominican Republic. He competed in the trap event at the 2012 Summer Olympics and placed 20th in the qualification round.

References

1974 births
Living people
Spanish male sport shooters
Dominican Republic male sport shooters
Olympic shooters of Spain
Olympic shooters of the Dominican Republic
Shooters at the 2000 Summer Olympics
Shooters at the 2012 Summer Olympics
Shooters at the 2015 Pan American Games
Pan American Games medalists in shooting
Pan American Games silver medalists for the Dominican Republic
Medalists at the 2015 Pan American Games
21st-century Spanish people